GURPS Illuminati is a supplement for the GURPS tabletop role-playing game about secret societies, conspiracies, and conspiracy theories.  Written by Nigel Findley, it was published in 1992, the year before Steve Jackson Games sued the Secret Service, and it won the Origins award for best role-playing game supplement in 1993, as the Origins Awards were not awarded in 1992.

Contents

GURPS Illuminati is a book about all aspects of running and playing in role playing games involving conspiracies.  As is obvious from the chapter headings, the writing is slightly whimsical, and the style of the book is reinforced by quotes from the supposed illuminati.

Introduction  A basic introduction to GURPS, conspiracy theories, and Gurps Illuminati

Characters  A chapter on character creation and development in a campaign using GURPS Illuminati.  This is the only chapter containing any rules for GURPS, although some of the other chapters have sample NPCs

The Illuminated Campaign  Gamemaster guidance on running a campaign using GURPS Illuminati.  It goes into detail about suggested organisation, how to run illuminated groups, and how to create settings involving them, and contains half a dozen suggested adventure seeds.

Illuminated Groups   Suggested groups to use in a game that assumes that many or all conspiracy theories are real.  Groups given a write-up include The Illuminati, the Merovingian dynasty,  the Cathars, the Prieuré de Sion, The Alphans, the "Time Meddlers", the Network, the Discordian Society, the Society of Assassins, the Templars, the Bavarian Illuminati, Banks and the Gnomes of Zurich, Environmental protesters and Ecoterrorists, the Freemasons, the Society of Light, Intelligence agencies, the Mafia (including a section about Prohibition), major corporations, Organised crime, Organised religion, Telephone companies, and Unions.

Why does Mr. Beamish have tinfoil in his hat?   A chapter about being on the outer edge of conspiracies, and how they can appear to have more influence and leverage than they actually do.

Just the facts, Ma'am   A chapter about knowing about conspiracy theories, responses, and how the conspiracies cover up when evidence about them is unearthed.

The Men in Black  A chapter about actively joining overarching conspiracies, or otherwise being on the inside of them.

Fnord!  A chapter about non-fictional secret societies, and about adding secret societies and conspiracies to settings that didn't previously have them.

Press the button marked "Help"  A chapter of GM advice on actual play.

In addition there are a few pages of bibliography and further reading.

Publication history
GURPS Illuminati built on the Illuminati card game, in its turn inspired by Robert Shea and Robert Anton Wilson's The Illuminatus! Trilogy.

Reception
GURPS Illuminati won the 1992 Origins Award for best roleplaying supplement.

Craig Sheeley reviewed GURPS Illuminati for Challenge #66. Sheeley comments in his conclusion: "GURPS Illuminati is one of this season's bestsellers for Steve Jackson Games, outselling even their masterpiece, Hacker. This is not to say that there are a lot of people out there who buy the conspiracy theory, or that there are a lot of gamers wanting to actually play the game of paranoia [...] More likely, there are a lot of people who appreciate a good product and a funny read."

Reviews
Alarums & Excursions (Issue 260 – Apr 1997)
The Unspeakable Oath #14/15
Arcane #18
 Casus Belli #70 (July 1992)

See also
 The Illuminatus! Trilogy
 Illuminati: New World Order
 List of conspiracy theories
 List of GURPS books

References

Illuminati
Origins Award winners
Role-playing game supplements introduced in 1992
Role-playing games about conspiracy theories
Works about the Illuminati